Mitra  is an Indian family name and surname found mostly amongst Bengali Hindus. This surname also has prevalence in Iran and is a popular Persian last name found in America. The surname may have been derived either from the word mitra meaning friend or ally or from the name of an important Indo-Iranian deity in the Vedas and in ancient Iran.

Mitras belong to Kayastha caste in Bengal. Bengali Kayasthas evolved as a caste from a category of officials or scribes, between the 5th/6th century CE and 11th/12th century CE, its component elements being putative Kshatriyas and mostly Brahmins. Mitras are considered as Kulin Kayasthas of Vishvamitra gotra, along with  Bose, Guha and Ghosh.

Notables
Amit Mitra (অমিত মিত্র), politician and current Finance Minister of West Bengal
Ashok Mitra finance minister of west bengal
Asoke Nath Mitra known for his work in nuclear physics, particle physics and quantum field theory and in particular, for his fundamental contributions in obtaining the exact solution of the nucleon 3- body problem
Abhik Mitra, Indian cricketer 
Ashesh Prasad Mitra was a physicist who headed the National Physics Laboratory in Delhi, India and was the Director General of the Council of Scientific and Industrial Research
Amit Mitra, Indian politician
Amitabh Mitra, Poet / Artist, South Africa
Antara Mitra, Indian singer
Arun Mitra (অরুণ মিত্র) (1909–2000), Bengali poet
Bimal Mitra (1912–1991), Bengali author
Chandan Mitra (born 1955), Indian journalist, editor/managing director of The Pioneer newspaper
Chittaranjan Mitra (1926–2008), Indian scientist and director of BITS Pilani
Debasis Mitra (born 1944), Indian mathematician
Debu Mitra, Indian cricketer 
Digambar Mitra (1817–1879), Derozian and Bengali Sheriff of Kolkata
Dinabandhu Mitra (দীনবন্ধু মিত্র) (1830–1873), Bengali dramatist (given name: Gandharva Narayan)
Falguni Mitra Pandit Falguni Mitra is a Hindustani classical vocalist who is known as a Dhrupad exponent of India.
Gautam MitraComputer Scientist
Hiran Mitra (born 1945), Bengali actor
Kamal Mitra (1912–1993), Bengali actor
Krishna Kumar Mitra Krishna Kumar Mitra (1852–1936) was an Indian freedom fighter, journalist and leader of the Brahmo Samaj
Koena Mitra (born 1981), Indian actress and former model
Lopamudra Mitra, Kolkata-based Bengali singer-songwriter
Nabagopal Mitra (1840–1894), Indian playwright, poet, essayist, patriot
Narendranath Mitra (নরেন্দ্রনাথ মিত্র) (1916–1975), Bengali writer, poet
Panchanan Mitra (1892–1936), professor of anthropology in India
Partha Mitra is an Indian-American neuroscientist and computer scientist. 
Peary Chand Mitra Indian writer, journalist, cultural activist and entrepreneur.
Premendra Mitra (প্রেমেন্দ্র মিত্র) (1904–1988), Bengali poet and author
Prabir Mitra (প্রবীর মিত্র) (born 1941), Bangladeshi movie and TV actor
Nilmani Mitra was an Indian civil engineer and architect, who designed the famous mansions of 19th century Kolkata.
Mahan Mitra Mahan Mj (born Mahan Mitra (Bengali: মহান মিত্র), 5 April 1968[1]), also known as Mahan Maharaj and Swami Vidyanathananda, is an Indian mathematician and monk of the Ramakrishna Order.
Rajendralal Mitra (1823/24-1891), the first modern Indologist of Indian origin
Ramon Mitra, Jr., Filipino statesman, diplomat, and a renowned pro-democracy activist
Raul Mitra, Filipino composer, arranger, songwriter, musical director, pianist, and keyboardist
Rhona Mitra ,(born 1976), English actress of Indian descent
Rina Mitra Chief Commissioner of the West Bengal Right to Public Service Commission.
Samarendra Kumar Mitra, Bengali scientist and mathematician who created India's first computer
Samaresh Mitra Samaresh Mitra (born 1937) is an Indian bioinorganic chemist and an INSA Senior Scientist at the Indian Institute of Chemical Biology (IICB).
Shyam Mitra, Indian cricket
Shaoli Mitra an Indian Bengali theatre and film actress, director, and playwright. padma shri awardee
Shyamal Mitra (1929–1987), Bengali singer
Sisir Kumar Mitra (শিশির কুমার মিত্র) (1890–1963), Indian physicist
Sombhu Mitra (1915–1997), Indian film and stage actor, director, playwright
Sreelekha Mitra (শ্রীলেখা মিত্র) (born 1975), Indian actress of TV and films
Subrata Mitra (সুব্রত মিত্র) (1930–2001), Indian cinematographer
Subrata K. Mitra was director and research professor at the Institute for South Asian Studies at the National University of Singapore
Subhrajit Mitra, (born 1976), Indian film maker
Suchitra Mitra (1924–2011), Indian singer-composer
Sumita Mitra developed the nanomaterials used in state-of-the-art 3M dental composites, which have been used in billions of procedures around the world.
Sushanta Mitra is an Indian-Canadian mechanical engineer
Tripti Mitra was a popular Indian actress of Bengali theatre and films

Fictional characters
Pradosh Chandra Mitter (Feluda), a fictional private investigator created by Satyajit Ray
Tapesh Ranjan Mitter (Topse), cousin of Feluda, created by Satyajit Ray

See also
Bose
Ghosh
Guha

References

Bengali Hindu surnames
Indian surnames
Kayastha